Adrián Marín may refer to:

Adrián Martín (motorcyclist) (born 1992), Spanish Grand Prix motorcycle racer
Adrián Marín (footballer, born 1994), Mexican footballer
Adrián Marín (footballer, born 1997), Spanish footballer

See also 
Adrián Martínez (disambiguation)